"C'mon! C'mon!" is a 1986 song by Bronski Beat from their album, Truthdare Doubledare. In its review of the album upon its release, Billboard identified "C'mon C'mon" as one of the stronger tracks that "should find mainstream and alternative fans." A music video for the song was directed by Peter Care. Despite being recognized as one of the stronger tracks on the album, the single only reached No. 20 in the UK singles chart, indicating Bronski Beat's popularity was beginning to wane.

References

Bronski Beat songs
1986 songs
1986 singles